The 2004 Rally Argentina (formally the 24th CTI Movil Rally Argentina) was the eighth round of the 2004 World Rally Championship. The race was held over four days between 15 and 18 July 2004, and was based in Villa Carlos Paz, Argentina. Citroen's Carlos Sainz won the race, his 26th and final win in the World Rally Championship.

Background

Entry list

Itinerary
All dates and times are ART (UTC−3).

Results

Overall

World Rally Cars

Classification

Special stages

Championship standings

Production World Rally Championship

Classification

Special stages

Championship standings

References

External links 
 Official website of the World Rally Championship
 2004 Rally Argentina  at Rallye-info 

Argentina
Rally Argentina
Rally